Nicholas Anthony Wood (born 6 January 1966) is an English former professional footballer who played as a forward. Born in Oldham, Lancashire, he played for Manchester United between 1985 and 1987. He made three first-team appearances, but was forced to retire from the game at the age of 22, having sustained a back injury.

External links
Profile at StretfordEnd.co.uk
Profile at MUFCInfo.com

1966 births
English footballers
Manchester United F.C. players
English Football League players
Living people
People from Oldham
Footballers from Oldham
Association football forwards